Ratnapuri may refer to:

Ratnapuri, India
Ratnapuri, Nepal